Evaristo "Jake" Rodríguez (born October 2, 1965) is a Puerto Rican former professional boxer who competed from 1988 to 1997. In 1994 he defeated Charles Murray to become the IBF junior welterweight champion. Two successful defenses of the title were made, until a loss to Kostya Tszyu in 1995. Later that year Rodríguez challenged WBC welterweight champion Pernell Whitaker, but lost via knockout.

!colspan="3" style="background:#C1D8FF;"|Regional titles
|-

See also
List of Puerto Rican boxing world champions

References

1965 births
Living people
People from Arroyo, Puerto Rico
International Boxing Federation champions
Puerto Rican male boxers
Welterweight boxers